Live Report represented the United Kingdom in the Eurovision Song Contest 1989 with the song "Why Do I Always Get It Wrong", which placed 2nd in Lausanne, Switzerland.

Before Eurovision

A Song for Europe 1989 
A Song for Europe 1989 was a very dis-jointed final. The original singer chosen for "Back in the Groove" was to have been Garry Gibb; the song "Shame" was to have been sung by its writer, Marwenna Haver, and the song that won had its name and the name of the performer changed.

The final was held on 24 March 1989 from Studio 6, at Television Centre, London, featuring eight songs and hosted by Terry Wogan on BBC1. A separate results show was broadcast on BBC1 the same evening. BBC Radio 2 simulcast the final and also broadcast the results show, both with commentary by Ken Bruce.

The eight songs in contention to represent the United Kingdom were premiered in various programmes on BBC Radio 2 between 20 and 23 March.

The BBC Concert Orchestra under the direction of Ronnie Hazlehurst as conductor accompanied all but the winning song, but despite performing live, the orchestra were off-screen, behind the set. Hazlehurst conducted two live keyboard players who accompanied the UK entry’s backing track at the Eurovision final in Lausanne.

For the second year running, the BBC convened a panel to pass comment on each of the songs. The panel comprised Deke Arlon, Gary Davies, Leslie Bricusse, and former Eurovision winner Lulu.

There were 300,000 televotes cast in 90 minutes of telephone lines being open for voting.

UK Discography 
Frankie Johnson - Back In The Groove: Polydor FJ2 (7" Single)/FJX2 (12" Single).
Elkie Brooks - Shame: Telstar STATS2394.
Julie C - You Stepped Out Of My Dreams: Sonet SON2343 (7" Single)/SONL2343 (12" Single).
Live Report - Why Do I Always Get It Wrong: Brouhaha CUE7 (7" Single)/12CUE7 (12" Single).

At Eurovision
The 1989 contest was staged at the Palais de Beaulieu in Lausanne, Switzerland on 6 May. 22 countries participated, and the UK performed seventh on the night. Live Report took second place with 130 points, seven points behind the winners, Yugoslavia.

Voting

References

1989
Countries in the Eurovision Song Contest 1989
Eurovision
Eurovision